Marvin Peersman (born 10 February 1991) is a Belgian professional footballer who plays as a left-back for Greek Super League club Aris.

Club career
Peersman began his professional football club career in 2009 at Beveren as a 17-year-old before signing for Royal Antwerp in 2010 and in 2012 Peersman signed for FC Dordrecht. After that, he played for Cambuur and Hapoel Tel Aviv in Israel.

He signed a contract with PAS Giannina on 7 August 2020. On 30 January 2022, he scored his first goal with the club in all competitions in a 2–0 home win game against Apollon Smyrnis.
He was voted man of the match for his performance.

In summer 2022 he signed for Aris.

International career
Peersman was born in Belgium. His mother is a Belgian woman of Flemish extraction and his father is a Ghanaian. Peersman has both a Belgian passport and a Ghanaian passport and is eligible to represent the Belgium and Ghana national teams. He made six appearances for the Belgium U19 national team in 2009 and 2010.

Career statistics

Honours
Individual
PAS Giannina Player of the Year: 2020–21

References

External links
 Voetbal International profile 

1991 births
Living people
People from Wilrijk
Belgian footballers
Belgian people of Ghanaian descent
Footballers from Antwerp
Association football defenders
Belgium youth international footballers
Challenger Pro League players
Eredivisie players
Eerste Divisie players
Liga Leumit players
Israeli Premier League players
Super League Greece players
K.S.K. Beveren players
Royal Antwerp F.C. players
FC Dordrecht players
SC Cambuur players
Hapoel Tel Aviv F.C. players
PAS Giannina F.C. players
Aris Thessaloniki F.C. players
Belgian expatriate footballers
Belgian expatriate sportspeople in the Netherlands
Expatriate footballers in the Netherlands
Belgian expatriate sportspeople in Israel
Expatriate footballers in Israel
Belgian expatriate sportspeople in Greece
Expatriate footballers in Greece